Warm Up is the debut extended play (EP) by Spanish singer and songwriter Bad Gyal. It was released on 19 March 2021 by Aftercluv Dance Lab and Interscope Records, and it is her first full-length release after being signed with these two labels in 2019.

Critical reception

In a review for Mondo Sonoro, Luis M. Maínez highlighted the quality of the production and the beats of all the tracks, yet stated that "Bad Gyal does not stop improving without innovating too much", and noted that "the vocal collaborations are less interesting than the musical ones."

Track listing
Credits adapted from Tidal.

Personnel
Credits adapted from Tidal and other sources.

Vocals

 Bad Gyal – primary vocals
 Rema – featured vocals (track 2)
 Juanka – featured vocals (track 3)
 Khea – featured vocals (track 4)
 Rauw Alejandro – featured vocals (track 8)

Production

 El Guincho – featured artist (track 1); production (tracks 1, 3–8)
 Izzy Beats – production (track 2)
 Supa Dups – production (track 2)
 Jasper Harris – production (track 3)
 Star Boy – production (track 3)
 Nely "el Arma Secreta" – production (track 4)
 Fakeguido – production (tracks 4–7)
 Rawsanches – production (tracks 4–5, 7)
 Sickdrumz – production (track 8)
 Scott Storch – production (track 8)

Technical

 Jaycen Joshua – mixing
 DJ Riggins – mixing assistance
 Jacob Richards – mixing assistance
 Mike Seaberg – mixing assistance
 Colin Leonard – mastering engineering (tracks 1–2, 4–7)
 Rawsanches – recording engineering (tracks 1, 5–6)
 Deli – recording engineering (track 2)
 Nely "el Arma Secreta" – recording engineering

Artwork

 Paul Lorant – art design
 Lois Cohen – photography

Charts

Weekly charts

Year-end charts

Release history

References

2021 debut EPs
Albums produced by el Guincho
Albums produced by Nely
Albums produced by Scott Storch
Albums produced by Supa Dups
Bad Gyal albums
Interscope Records EPs
Spanish-language EPs